Sydenham School (known as Sydenham Girls by locals) is a comprehensive girls' school located on Dartmouth Road (A2216) in Sydenham, London.

History
The school was founded in 1917 as a girls' grammar school, known as Sydenham County Grammar School for Girls. London County Council commissioned Basil Spence & Partners, in the early 1950s, to design additional accommodation to allow the school to increase capacity from 600 to 1140 students and to merge with Shackleton School to become a comprehensive school. This took place in 1956 on completion of the new six-storey, E-shaped, classroom block, on which work had begun in 1954. The official opening ceremony took place on 28 February 1957.

In 2003 Sydenham School was granted Specialist Science College status and in 2008 it was granted Specialist in Mathematics by the DfES. Sydenham School has close ties to Forest Hill School, a nearby boys' comprehensive school.

Form system
In each year there are 8 tutor groups, named for the letters in SYDENHAM.

Admissions
The current headmistress is Ms Gloria Lowe. It has always been a girls' school. Forest Hill Pools and Forest Hill library is next door.

Academic performance
In the last OFSTED inspection, Sydenham School was graded as 'good with outstanding features  '. It gets GCSEs and A levels above the England average.(64%)

Notable former pupils

 Katie Brayben, Olivier Award Winner 2015 Best Actress in a Musical.
 Sarah Jane Crawford,  television and radio presenter.
 Tasha Danvers, 400 metre hurdler, bronze in the Beijing 2008 Olympics.
 Mia Goth, actress

Sydenham County Grammar School for Girls
 Eva Crane, researcher into bees
 Linda Ludgrove, swimmer
 Elsie Widdowson, dietitian

See also
 Sydenham High School (UK), nearby girls independent school for ages 4–18, and part of the Girls' Day School Trust (GPSDT)
 Forest Hill School, partnered school for boys 11-18

References

https://sydenham.fluencycms.co.uk/science

External links 
 Sydenham School
 EduBase

Girls' schools in London
Secondary schools in the London Borough of Lewisham
Educational institutions established in 1917
1917 establishments in England
Community schools in the London Borough of Lewisham
Basil Spence buildings
Sydenham, London